Juha Pitkämäki (born December 4, 1979) is a Finnish retired professional ice hockey goaltender.

Pitkämäki played in the SM-liiga for Ilves, JYP and HIFK. He also played in Elitserien for Mora IK and Timrå IK and the Danish Ligaen for AaB Ishockey.

References

1979 births
Living people
AaB Ishockey players
Finnish ice hockey goaltenders
HIFK (ice hockey) players
Ilves players
JYP Jyväskylä players
Kokkolan Hermes players
KOOVEE players
Mora IK players
Ice hockey people from Tampere
Timrå IK players